Tinit is a rural locality (a selo) and the administrative centre of Tinitsky Selsoviet, Tabasaransky District, Republic of Dagestan, Russia. The population was 1,384 as of 2010. There are 12 streets.

Geography 
Tinit is located 18 km southeast of Khuchni (the district's administrative centre) by road. Burgankent is the nearest rural locality.

References 

Rural localities in Tabasaransky District